Rootletin also known as ciliary rootlet coiled-coil protein (CROCC) is a protein that in humans is encoded by the CROCC gene.
Rootletin is a component of the ciliary rootlet, and, together with CEP68 and CEP250, is required for centrosome cohesion.

Rootletin is an important protein in the ciliary rootlet, particular for the structure and can be considered an important protein in mitosis as it is a centrosome linker.

Function
This protein forms part of the ciliary rootlet structure. It also helps to contribute to the centrosome cohesion before mitosis. Expression of rooletin leads to the formation of fibrous protein.

Structure
This protein is part of the structure  of a ciliary rootlet. This cytoskeletal-like structure starts from the basal body at one end of the cilium and extends towards nucleus. Its molecular structure consists of a globular head domain and a tail domain made up of coiled-coil structures.

Protein interactions
A large coiled-coil protein, C-Nap1, is  a docking site for the fibrous tether to proximal ends of centrioles which Rootletin physically interacts with. Furthermore, Rootletin is phosphorylated by  Nek2 kinase.

References

Further reading